Rochdale Interchange is a transport hub located in the town of Rochdale in Greater Manchester, England, run by Transport for Greater Manchester.

It was opened in November 2013, integrating a new bus station with Rochdale Town Centre tram stop

It has the following facilities: Public Toilets, Disabled Toilets, Cycle Parking, Cycle Hub, McColl's (convenience store), Caffe Grande Abaco (coffee shop), Taxi Rank, Free Cash Machine, TFGM Travelshop.

Services
The majority of bus service that serve Rochdale are run by Rosso, while the remainder of services are run by Diamond Bus North West, First West Yorkshire, Go North West, First Greater Manchester and Team Pennine.

There are frequent buses from Rochdale to destinations that include Accrington, Ashton-under-Lyne, Bolton, Burnley, Bury, Halifax, Manchester, Oldham, Rawtenstall and Todmorden, as well as other parts of the Rochdale borough including Castleton, Heywood, Hollingworth Lake, Kirkholt, Littleborough, Middleton, Milnrow, Newhey and Norden.

References

Bus stations in Greater Manchester
Buildings and structures in Rochdale
Transport infrastructure completed in 2013